Fyodor Veniaminovich Usov (born 30 March 1982) is a former Russian football player.

He represented Russia at the 1999 UEFA European Under-16 Championship.

External links
 

1982 births
Living people
Russian footballers
Association football defenders
FC Zenit Saint Petersburg players
Russian Premier League players
FC Lada-Tolyatti players
FC Zenit-2 Saint Petersburg players